Finchtown was a town in Bryan County, Oklahoma, but was submerged in the process of making Lake Texoma, which was built in the 1940s.
There was a ferry built there as reported in the July 15, 1905 Woodland Beacon.

Geography of Bryan County, Oklahoma
Ghost towns in Oklahoma